Gizzi is both a given name and surname. Notable people with the name include:

Gizzi Erskine (born 1979), British chef
Chris Gizzi (born 1975), American football player
Domenico Gizzi (1680–1745), Italian singing teacher
Jairo Ramos Gizzi (born 1971), Italian baseball player
John Gizzi (born 1955), American political journalist
Loris Gizzi (1899–1986), Italian actor
Michael Gizzi (1949–2010), American poet
Peter Gizzi (born 1959), American poet
Tom Gizzi, American football player
Tommaso Pasquale Gizzi (1787–1849), Italian cardinal